Adi Annamalaiyar Temple is a Siva temple in Adi Annamalai in Tiruvannamalai district in Tamil Nadu (India). This temple is in fact older than the “big” (Arunachaleshwar/ Annamalaiyar) temple in Tiruvannamalai. Like the lingam in the big temple, the lingam in the Adi Annamalai temple is also a swayambhu (self generated) lingam.

Location
Adi Annamalai or Adhi Annamalai temple also known as Ani Annamalai is found in the girivalam of Tiruvannamalai temple.

Vaippu Sthalam
It is one of the shrines of the Vaippu Sthalams sung by Tamil Saivite Nayanar Appar.

Presiding deity
The presiding deity is known as Adi Annamalaiyar or Adi Arunachalesvarar. The Goddess is known as Adi Abithakujalambal.

References

Hindu temples in Tiruvannamalai district
Shiva temples in Tiruvannamalai district

Tiruvannamalai